Bees Make Honey is a 2017 dark comedy-drama-mystery film directed by Alice Eve's brother, Jack Eve. The film stars Alice Eve, Hermione Corfield, Joshua McGuire, Joséphine de La Baume, Anatole Taubman, and Trevor Eve. The film premiered at the 2017 Raindance Film Festival.

Cast
 Alice Eve as Honey
 Hermione Corfield as Tatiana
 Joshua McGuire as Mr. Conick
 Joséphine de La Baume as Bijoux
 Anatole Taubman as Mr. Werner
 Ivanno Jeremiah as Russell
 Wilf Scolding as Inspector Shoerope
 Trevor Eve as Commissioner

Release
The film premiered at the Raindance Film Festival on 23 September 2017. Content Media secured distribution rights to the film on the same day.

References

External links
 

2010s mystery comedy-drama films
2017 films
British mystery comedy-drama films
Films set in 1934
Films set in England
2010s English-language films
2010s British films